Contai Polytechnic , established in 1990,  is a government polytechnic located in Contai,  Purba Medinipur district, West Bengal. This polytechnic is affiliated to the West Bengal State Council of Technical Education,  and recognized by AICTE, New Delhi. This polytechnic offers diploma courses in Electrical, Electronics and Telecommunication, Chemical, Computer Science & Technology, Mechanical, Pharmacy and Civil Engineering.

External links
 Admission to Polytechnics in West Bengal for Academic Session 2006-2007
http://www.contaipolytechnic.com/

References

Universities and colleges in Purba Medinipur district
Educational institutions established in 1990
1990 establishments in West Bengal
Technical universities and colleges in West Bengal